Rio das Pedras  is a municipality in the State of São Paulo, Brazil, located at the Microregion of Piracicaba.
As of 2020, it has 35,738 people and an area of 226.657 square kilometers.

Notable people
Ivan Football player

References

External links
Official site

Municipalities in São Paulo (state)